Gandom Kesh-e Chitab (also Romanized as Gandom Kesh-e Chītāb; also known as Gandom Kesh) is a village in Chenar Rural District, Kabgian District, Dana County, Kohgiluyeh and Boyer-Ahmad Province, Iran. At the 2006 census, its population was 100, in 17 families.

References 

Populated places in Dana County